This is a list of diplomatic missions of Togo (excluding honorary consulates). Togo has a modest number of diplomatic missions abroad.

Africa

 Kinshasa (Embassy)

 Addis Ababa (Embassy)

 Libreville (Embassy)

 Accra (Embassy)

 Rabat (Embassy)

 Abuja (Embassy)

 Pretoria (Embassy)

Americas

 Brasília (Embassy)

 Ottawa (Embassy)

 Washington, D.C. (Embassy)

Asia

 Beijing (Embassy)

 New Delhi (Embassy)

 Tokyo (Embassy)

 Kuwait City (Embassy)

 Ankara (Embassy)

Europe

Brussels (Embassy)

 Paris (Embassy)

 Berlin (Embassy)

 London (Embassy)

Multilateral organisations
 African Union
Addis Ababa (Permanent Mission to the African Union)

Brussels (Mission to the European Union)

New York (Permanent Mission to the United Nations)
Geneva (Permanent Mission to the headquarter of United Nations in Europe)*

Gallery

See also
 Foreign relations of Togo

References

Diplomatic missions

Togo